Valdemar Dalquist (September 23, 1888 – January 20, 1937) was a Swedish stage and film actor.

Selected filmography
 Cirkus Bimbini (1921)
 Cavaliers of the Crown (1930)
 Tired Theodore (1931)
 Colourful Pages (1931)
 Love and Dynamite (1933)
 House Slaves (1933)
 The Atlantic Adventure (1934)
 The Count of the Old Town (1935)
 It Pays to Advertise (1936)

References

Bibliography
 Chandler, Charlotte. Ingrid: Ingrid Bergman, A Personal Biography. Simon and Schuster, 2007.
 Wallengren, Ann-Kristin.  Welcome Home Mr Swanson: Swedish Emigrants and Swedishness on Film. Nordic Academic Press, 2014.

External links

1888 births
1937 deaths
Swedish male film actors
Swedish male stage actors
Swedish male silent film actors
20th-century Swedish male actors
People from Grästorp Municipality